Jelow-e Sofla (also Romanized as Jelow-e Soflá; also known as Chalāu and Jelow) is a village in Sar Firuzabad Rural District, Firuzabad District, Kermanshah County, Kermanshah Province, Iran. At the 2006 census, its population was 148, in 30 families.

References 

Populated places in Kermanshah County